The Ligai Yakumi Tojikiston (Tajiki: Лигаи Якуми Тоҷикистон),, or Tajikistan First League is a football league in Tajikistan, the second level of importance after the Tajikistan Higher League.

It is operated under the auspices of the Tajikistan Football League Organization and rebranded Tajikistan Football Federation. The Tajikistan First League was founded in 2004. According to previous reports, Tajikistan's First League was founded in 1992, as well as many "First Leagues" of other Post-Soviet countries.

Format
12 clubs participate in the Tajikistan First League. The winner of the Tajikistan First League receives a ticket to the Tajikistan Higher League (The winner of the First League is allowed to participate in the Higher League after obtaining a license and fulfilling certain obligations. Otherwise the club remains in the First League), and the club who took second place will play play off matches with the club who took seventh place in the Tajikistan Higher League. The winner of the playoffs is eligible to participate in the Higher League, and the losing club will start the next season in the First League. Clubs who have taken the last place in the First League are not always relegated from the First League. It depends on the capabilities (Finance, License) of the club next season. Usually the clubs that took the last place in the First League is relegated to the Tajikistan Second League. Their place is taken by the best team from the Tajikistan Second League.

Winners

References

External links
Tajikistan Football League Organization official website
 Tajikistan Football Federation official website

Football competitions in Tajikistan
2
Tajikistan
Sports leagues established in 1992
Sports leagues established in 2004
1992 establishments in Tajikistan
2004 establishments in Tajikistan